In the mathematical field of analysis, the Nash–Moser theorem, discovered by mathematician John Forbes Nash and named for him and Jürgen Moser, is a generalization of the inverse function theorem on Banach spaces to settings when the required solution mapping for the linearized problem is not bounded.

Introduction
In contrast to the Banach space case, in which the invertibility of the derivative at a point is sufficient for a map to be locally invertible, the Nash–Moser theorem requires the derivative to be invertible in a neighborhood. The theorem is widely used to prove local existence for non-linear partial differential equations in spaces of smooth functions. It is particularly useful when the inverse to the derivative "loses" derivatives, and therefore the Banach space implicit function theorem cannot be used.

History
It is clear from his paper that his method can be generalized. , for instance, showed that Nash's methods could be successfully applied to solve problems on periodic orbits in celestial mechanics in the KAM theory. However, it has proven quite difficult to find a suitable general formulation; there is, to date, no all-encompassing version; various versions due to Gromov, Hamilton, Hörmander, Saint-Raymond, Schwartz, and Sergeraert are given in the references below. That of Hamilton's, quoted below, is particularly widely cited.

The problem of loss of derivatives
This will be introduced in the original setting of the Nash–Moser theorem, that of the isometric embedding problem. Let  be an open subset of  Consider the map

given by

In Nash's solution of the isometric embedding problem (as would be expected in the solutions of nonlinear partial differential equations) a major step is a statement of the schematic form "If f is such that P(f) is positive-definite, then for any matrix-valued function g which is close to P(f), there exists fg with P(fg)=g."

Following standard practice, one would expect to apply the Banach space inverse function theorem. So, for instance, one might expect to restrict P to C5(Ω;ℝN) and, for an immersion f in this domain, to study the linearization C5(Ω;ℝN)→C4(Ω;Symn×n(ℝ)) given by

If one could show that this were invertible, with bounded inverse, then the Banach space inverse function theorem directly applies.

However, there is a deep reason that such a formulation cannot work. The issue is that there is a second-order differential operator of P(f) which coincides with a second-order differential operator applied to f. To be precise: if f is an immersion then

where RP(f) is the scalar curvature of the Riemannian metric P(f), H(f) denotes the mean curvature of the immersion f, and h(f) denotes its second fundamental form; the above equation is the Gauss equation from surface theory. So, if P(f) is C4, then RP(f) is generally only C2. Then, according to the above equation, f can generally be only C4; if it were C5 then |H|2-|h|2 would have to be at least C3. The source of the problem can be quite succinctly phrased in the following way: the Gauss equation shows that there is a differential operator Q such that the order of the composition of Q with P is less than the sum of the orders of P and Q.

In context, the upshot is that the inverse to the linearization of P, even if it exists as a map C∞(Ω;Symn×n(ℝ))→C∞(Ω;ℝN), cannot be bounded between appropriate Banach spaces, and hence the Banach space implicit function theorem cannot be applied.

By exactly the same reasoning, one cannot directly apply the Banach space implicit function theorem even if one uses the Hölder spaces, the Sobolev spaces, or any of the Ck spaces. In any of these settings, an inverse to the linearization of P will fail to be bounded.

This is the problem of loss of derivatives. A very naive expectation is that, generally, if P is an order k differential operator, then if P(f) is in Cm then f must be in Cm+k. However, this is somewhat rare. In the case of uniformly elliptic differential operators, the famous Schauder estimates show that this naive expectation is borne out, with the caveat that one must replace the Ck spaces with the Hölder spaces Ck,α; this causes no extra difficulty whatsoever for the application of the Banach space implicit function theorem. However, the above analysis shows that this naive expectation is not borne out for the map which sends an immersion to its induced Riemannian metric; given that this map is of order 1, one does not gain the "expected" one derivative upon inverting the operator. The same failure is common in geometric problems, where the action of the diffeomorphism group is the root cause, and in problems of hyperbolic differential equations, where even in the very simplest problems one does not have the naively expected smoothness of a solution. All of these difficulties provide common contexts for applications of the Nash–Moser theorem.

The schematic form of Nash's solution
This section only aims to describe an idea, and as such it is intentionally imprecise. For concreteness, suppose that P is an order-one differential operator on some function spaces, so that it defines a map P:Ck+1→Ck for each k. Suppose that, at some Ck+1 function f, the linearization DPf:Ck+1→Ck has a right inverse S:Ck→Ck; in the above language this reflects a "loss of one derivative". One can concretely see the failure of trying to use Newton's method to prove the Banach space implicit function theorem in this context: if g∞ is close to P(f) in Ck and one defines the iteration

then f1∈Ck+1 implies that g∞-P(fn) is in Ck, and then f2 is in Ck. By the same reasoning, f3 is in Ck-1, and f4 is in Ck-2, and so on. In finitely many steps the iteration must end, since it will lose all regularity and the next step will not even be defined.

Nash's solution is quite striking in its simplicity. Suppose that for each t>0 one has a smoothing operator θt which takes a Cn function, returns a smooth function, and approximates the identity when t is large. Then the "smoothed" Newton iteration

transparently does not encounter the same difficulty as the previous "unsmoothed" version, since it is an iteration in the space of smooth functions which never loses regularity. So one has a well-defined sequence of functions; the major surprise of Nash's approach is that this sequence actually converges to a function f∞ with P(f∞)=g∞. For many mathematicians, this is rather surprising, since the "fix" of throwing in a smoothing operator seems too superficial to overcome the deep problem in the standard Newton method. For instance, on this point Mikhael Gromov says

Remark. The true "smoothed Newton iteration" is a little more complicated than the above form, although there are a few inequivalent forms, depending on where one chooses to insert the smoothing operators. The primary difference is that one requires invertibility of DPf for an entire open neighborhood of choices of f, and then one uses the "true" Newton iteration, corresponding to (using single-variable notation)

as opposed to

the latter of which reflects the forms given above. This is rather important, since the improved quadratic convergence of the "true" Newton iteration is significantly used to combat the error of "smoothing," in order to obtain convergence. Certain approaches, in particular Nash's and Hamilton's, follow the solution of an ordinary differential equation in function space rather than an iteration in function space; the relation of the latter to the former is essentially that of the solution of Euler's method to that of a differential equation.

Hamilton's formulation of the theorem

The following statement appears in :
Let F and G be tame Fréchet spaces, let  be an open subset, and let  be a smooth tame map. Suppose that for each  the linearization  is invertible, and the family of inverses, as a map  is smooth tame. Then P is locally invertible, and each local inverse  is a smooth tame map.
Similarly, if each linearization is only injective, and a family of left inverses is smooth tame, then P is locally injective. And if each linearization is only surjective, and a family of right inverses is smooth tame, then P is locally surjective with a smooth tame right inverse.

Tame Fréchet spaces
A  consists of the following data:
 a vector space 
 a countable collection of seminorms  such that

for all  One requires these to satisfy the following conditions:
 if  is such that  for all  then 
 if  is a sequence such that, for each  and every  there exists  such that  implies  then there exists  such that, for each  one has
 
Such a graded Fréchet space is called a  if it satisfies the following condition:
 there exists  and  such that for each  there is a number  such that

for every  and

for every  
Here  denotes the vector space of exponentially decreasing sequences in  that is,

The laboriousness of the definition is justified by the primary examples of tamely graded Fréchet spaces:
 If  is a compact smooth manifold (with or without boundary) then  is a tamely graded Fréchet space, when given any of the following graded structures:
 take  to be the -norm of 
 If  is a compact smooth manifold-with-boundary then  the space of smooth functions whose derivatives all vanish on the boundary, is a tamely graded Fréchet space, with any of the above graded structures.
To recognize the tame structure of these examples, one topologically embeds  in a Euclidean space,  is taken to be the space of  functions on this Euclidean space, and the map  is defined by dyadic restriction of the Fourier transform.

Presented directly as above, the meaning and naturality of the "tame" condition is rather obscure. The situation is clarified if one re-considers the basic examples given above, in which the relevant "exponentially decreasing" sequences in Banach spaces arise from restriction of a Fourier transform. Recall that smoothness of a function on Euclidean space is directly related to the rate of decay of its Fourier transform. "Tameness" is thus seen as a condition which allows an abstraction of the idea of a "smoothing operator" on a function space. Given a Banach space  and the corresponding space  of exponentially decreasing sequences in  the precise analogue of a smoothing operator can be defined in the following way.

If one accepts the schematic idea of the proof devised by Nash, and in particular his use of smoothing operators, the "tame" condition then becomes rather reasonable.

Smooth tame maps
Let F and G be graded Fréchet spaces.
 implies that  is also contained in U.

A smooth map  is called a  if for all  the derivative  satisfies the following:
 there exist  and  such that  implies

for all . 

The fundamental example says that, on a compact smooth manifold, a nonlinear partial differential operator (possibly between sections of vector bundles over the manifold) is a smooth tame map; in this case, r can be taken to be the order of the operator.

Proof of the theorem
Let S denote the family of inverse mappings  Consider the special case that F and G are spaces of exponentially decreasing sequences in Banach spaces, i.e. F=Σ(B) and G=Σ(C). (It is not too difficult to see that this is sufficient to prove the general case.) For a positive number c, consider the ordinary differential equation in Σ(B) given by

References 

 

.

Differential equations
Topological vector spaces
Inverse functions
Theorems in functional analysis